Clay pigeon shooting, also known as clay target shooting, is a shooting sport involving shooting a firearm at special flying targets known as clay pigeons, or clay targets.

The terminology commonly used by clay shooters often relates to times past, when live-pigeon competitions were held. Although such competitions were made illegal in the United Kingdom in 1921, a target may still be called a "bird", a hit may be referred to as a "kill", and a missed target as a "bird away"; the machine which projects the targets is still known as a "trap".

History 
Clay targets began to be used in place of live pigeons around 1875. Asphalt targets were later developed, but the name "clay targets" stuck. In 1893, the Inanimate Bird Shooting Association was formed in England. It was renamed to the Clay Bird Shooting Association in 1903. It held annual clay-pigeon-shooting contests and lasted until the outbreak of World War I. In 1921, the British parliament passed a bill without opposition making it illegal to shoot birds from traps.

Disciplines 
Clay pigeon shooting has at least 20 different forms of regulated competition called disciplines, although most can be grouped under the main headings of trap, skeet, and sporting.

 In the trap shooting, the targets are launched from a single "house" or machine, generally away from the shooter.
 In skeet shooting, targets are launched from two houses in somewhat sideways paths that intersect in front of the shooter.
 Sporting clays includes a more complex course, with many launch points.

Sporting clays

The English Sporting discipline has the sport's biggest following. While the other disciplines only use standard targets, in Sporting almost anything goes. Targets are thrown in a great variety of trajectories, angles, speeds, elevations and distances and the discipline was originally devised to simulate live quarry shooting, hence some of the names commonly used on sporting stands: springing teal, driven pheasant, bolting rabbit, crossing pigeon, dropping duck, etc. Disciplines in this group include English sporting, international (FITASC) sporting, super sporting sportrap, and Compak sporting.

This discipline can have an infinite variety of "stands". English sporting is the most popular form of clay shooting in the UK, and a course or competition will feature a given number of stands each of which has a predetermined number of targets, all traveling along the same path and speed, either as singles or doubles.

Each stand will feature a different type of target; e.g., crosser, driven, quartering, etc. International (FITASC) sporting gives a much greater variety of targets in terms of trajectory and speed, and is shot by squads of six competitors in rounds of 25 targets at a time. Super Sporting is a hybrid of the two preceding varieties. There are also other formats such as Compak sporting and sportrap in which five cages are surrounded by a number of traps, and shooters fire a specific combinations or singles from each stand according to a program displayed in front of the cage.

Maze clays shooting
This is a new shotgun game that offers sporting clays and FITASC target presentations on a skeet/trap or open field. This is possible by using a movable support system that carries the release buttons (wired or wireless setup) from 6 to 9 traps and the dual safety screen in any place on the field. As a result, the shooter can shoot in safe conditions upon target presentations in varying range (10 to 60 yards) and varying angles (sharp to wide).

Trap shooting

Targets are thrown either as singles or doubles from one or more traps situated some 15 m in front of the shooter, and are generally going away from the firing point at varying speeds, angles and elevations. The most common disciplines in this group are:
Down-The-Line (DTL) Single Barrel
Double Rise
Automatic Ball Trap (ABT)
Olympic Trap
Double Trap
Helice (or ZZ)

Down-the-Line
Also known as DTL, this is a popular trap shooting discipline. Targets are thrown to a distance of 45 to 50 metres at a fixed height of approximately 2.75 m and with a horizontal spread of up to 22 degrees either side of the centre line. Each competitor shoots at a single target in turn, but without moving from the stand until all have shot five targets. Then they all move one place to the right, and continue to do so until they have all completed a standard round of 25 birds. Scoring of each target is 3 points for a first barrel kill, 2 points for a second barrel kill and 0 for a miss (maximum 75 points per round). Variations of this discipline are single barrel, double rise, and handicap-by-distance.

Olympic trap
As its name indicates, this is one of the disciplines which form part of the shooting programme at the Olympic Games. A trench in front of the shooting stands conceals 15 traps arranged in five groups of three. Shooters take turns to shoot at a target each, before moving in a clockwise direction to the next stand in the line. Targets for each shooter are thrown immediately upon his call and are selected by a shooting scheme (program) that ensures all competitors receive exactly the same target selection, but in an unpredictable randomised order to the extent that there will be one straight, two left and two right targets for each stand from any one of the three traps directly in front of him/her; guessing which one is next is impossible unless the shooter is on his/her last five targets.

Olympic trap targets are set to travel 76 metres (+/-1m) at the top of trench level marker peg, unless the terrain is dead flat, at varying elevations and with a maximum horizontal angle of 45 degrees either side of the centre line (being where the target exits the trench). Scoring is on the basis of one point per target killed, regardless of whether this is achieved with the first or with the second barrel unless it is a final where the top six scorers shoot off as a single barrel event, regardless of local club grades if any.

A simpler and cheaper to install variation of this discipline is known as automatic ball trap (ABT) where only one trap is used and target variation is obtained by the continuous oscillation of the trap in both horizontal and vertical directions in order to give the same spread of targets as in Olympic trap. Similarly, the targets are also thrown to a maximum of 76 metres.

Also known as Bunker Trap, and International Trap

Universal trench
A variation on the theme of trap shooting, sometimes known as five trap. Five traps are installed in a trench in front of the shooting stands, all set at different angles, elevations and speeds, and upon the call of "Pull!" by the shooter any one of the five machines, selected at random, will be released.

Horizontal angles can vary from 0 degrees to 45 degrees either side of the centre line and target distance is between 60 and 70 metres. Elevations can vary, as in other trap disciplines (except DTL), between 1.5 and 3.5 metres above ground level.

There are 10 different schemes available.

Skeet shooting

Skeet is a word of Scandinavian origin, though the discipline originated in America. Targets are thrown in singles and doubles from 2 trap houses situated some 40 metres apart, at opposite ends of a semicircular arc on which there are seven shooting positions. The targets are thrown at set trajectories and speeds. The main disciplines in this group are English skeet, Olympic skeet and American (NSSA) skeet.

In NSSA discipline, targets are released in a combination of singles and doubles, adding up to a total of 25 targets per round, from the High and Low trap houses on a fixed trajectory and speed. Variety is achieved by shooting round the seven stations on the semicircle, followed by an eighth station, located between stations one and seven. Scoring is on the basis of 1 point per target killed, up to a maximum of 25.

In English skeet (by far the most popular of the skeet disciplines), the gun position is optional (i.e., pre-mounted or out-of-shoulder when the target is called) and the targets are released immediately upon the shooter's call.

In Olympic skeet, the targets travel at a considerably faster speed, the release of the target can be delayed up to 3 seconds after calling and the gun-down position is compulsory. There is also an eighth shooting station, midway between the two houses.

NSSA and English version of Skeet have the concept of option targets, where the shooter has to repeat the first missed target. In the situation where the first 24 targets are all hit, the last target is considered the option. Here is a representation of Skeet sequences for all variations.

Electrocibles or helice shooting
Originating in Belgium during the 1960s, Electrocibles is similar to trap shooting, but the clays are equipped with a helice that will give the clay an erratic and unpredictable flight. The helice is composed of two winged plastic propellers with a white clay in the centre. Now the sport is named helice shooting.

Plastic propellers holding a detachable centre piece are rotated at high speed and released randomly from one of five traps. They fly out in an unpredictable way; so-said buzzing through the air. It is designed specifically to simulate as closely as possible the old sport of live pigeon shooting. Its original name of ZZ comes from the inventor who made them out of zinc, and had previously shot a specific breed of pigeon called a zurito; hence the term the zinc zurito.  World and European Championships are held every year organized by FITASC.

Targets 

The targets used for the sport are usually in the shape of an inverted saucer, made from a mixture of pitch and pulverized limestone rock designed to withstand being thrown from traps at very high speeds, but at the same time being easily broken when hit by just a very few lead or steel pellets from a shotgun.

The targets are usually fluorescent orange or black, but other colours such as white, or yellow are frequently used in order that they can be clearly seen against varying backgrounds and/or light conditions.

Targets are made to very exacting specifications with regard to their weight and dimensions and must conform to set international standards.

There are several types of targets that are used for the various disciplines, with a standard 108 mm size being the most common used in American Trap, Skeet, and Sporting Clays while International disciplines of these same games use a slightly larger 110 mm diameter size. Only the standard 108/110 mm target is used in all of the trap and skeet disciplines. Sporting shoots feature the full range of targets (except ZZ) to provide the variety that is a hallmark of the discipline.

All three sports use a shotgun, and in the sporting disciplines are sub-classified by the type of game the clay target represents (pigeon, rabbit, etc.). The two primary methods of projecting clay targets are airborne and ground (rolling).

Naturally, the simplest method of throwing a clay target is by hand, either into the air or along the ground. This method is the simplest, and many "trick shot" shooters throw their own targets (some able to throw as many as ten birds up and hit each individually before any land). However, a multitude of devices have been developed to throw the birds more easily and with more consistency. A plastic sling-like device is the simplest, though modern shooting ranges will usually have machines that throw the clay targets in consistent arcs at the push of a button.

Midi Same saucer shape as the standard but with a diameter of only 90 mm; these targets are faster than the standard types.
Mini This target is sometimes likened to a flying bumblebee at only 60 mm in diameter and 20 mm in height.
Battue A very thin target measuring about 108–110 mm in diameter, it flies very fast and falls off very suddenly simulating a duck landing. They are generally more expensive than other targets.
Rabbit A thicker, but standard 108–110 mm diameter flat target in the shape of a wheel designed to run along the ground.
ZZ This is a plastic, standard sized target attached to the center of a two-blade propeller of different color designed to zigzag in flight in a totally unpredictable manner.

Traps 

Traps are purpose-made, spring-loaded, flywheel or rotational devices especially designed to launch the different types of targets in singles or pairs at distances of up to 100 metres.

These machines vary from the very simple hand-cocked, hand-loaded and hand-released types to the highly sophisticated fully automatic variety, which can hold up to 600 targets in their own magazine and are electrically or pneumatically operated. Target release is by remote control, either by pressing a button or by an acoustic system activated by the shooter's voice.

Target speeds and trajectories can be easily modified and varied to suit the discipline or type of shooting required.

Guns 
Clay pigeon shooting is performed with a shotgun. The type of shotgun used is often a matter of taste and affected by local laws as well as the governing body of the sport in competitive cases.

All types of shotguns are suitable for clay pigeon shooting, however the ability to fire multiple shots in quick succession is generally considered important. Some skilled shooters will use a single shot firearm in order to add to the challenge. Traditionally Over and Under and Side by Side shotguns have been popular, however semi-automatic and to a lesser extent pump-action have been making gains, particularly as the cost of reliable, accurate semi-automatics has come down over the last decade.

Single-Shot Most single shot shotguns are break action; they operate similarly to the over and under and the side-by-side except they have only one barrel and can hold only one shot. Some are very inexpensive, and they are the most popular type of gun in American Trap.   Most other clay pigeon shooting disciplines require guns capable of holding two shells. The low weight of some single-shot guns result in excessive recoil which further diminishes their appeal for high volume clay shooting.

Over-And-Under (sometimes shortened to O/U) As its name indicates this gun has two barrels aligned horizontally and stacked vertically. There is usually one trigger however some models have two. Within this type there are three sub-groups of specification: trap, skeet, and sporting. Trap guns are generally heavier and longer barreled (normally ) with tight choking and designed to shoot slightly above the point of aim.

Side-By-Side (sometimes shortened to SXS) Like the over and under, there are two barrels, however instead of being arranged in a vertical stack they are next to each other on a horizontal plane. Side-by-sides are harder to aim for new shooters, as the two barrels does not provide the same instinctive feedback as the single visible barrel of a semi-automatic or O/U. Modern production of SXS weapons is limited, in favor of O/U, and older weapons are usually not rated for steel shot, preventing their use on many shooting ranges.

Pump-Action This is a single barreled gun that reloads from a tubular or box magazine when the user slides a grip toward and then away from themselves. The pump-action format is popular with casual shooters in the US, but is far less common in Europe. The pump-action is inherently slower than all but the single barrel break action and thus follow up shots are more difficult. In addition to this, although their mechanical complexity is comparable to that of the semi-automatic they lack the latter's advantage of recoil reduction.

Semi-Automatic This is a single barreled gun that chambers a new shell from a magazine automatically after each shot, but which requires the shooter to press the trigger for each shot. This design combines reduced recoil and relatively low weight with quick follow up shots.

Cartridges 

All Shotgun cartridges can be used including 10, 12, 16, 20, 28 gauge, and .410 bore. They are readily available in gun shops and at shooting grounds, and within limitations as to the shot size and the weight of the shot load are suitable for clay shooting at CPSA affiliated grounds and for use in events coming under CPSA rules. Though home loaded cartridges allow the user to customize the ballistic characteristics of their shells, they are generally not allowed at clay pigeon shooting events unless specified otherwise.

The instructions and specifications are printed on the boxes. For clay competition, shot size must not exceed 2.6 mm/English No. 6.

Laser clay shooting
Laser clay pigeon shooting, also known as laser clay shooting or just laser shooting, is a variation on the traditional clay pigeon shooting where the shotguns are disabled and fitted with laser equipment that can detect hits on specially modified reflective clays. Laser clay pigeon shooting offers a safe alternative for beginners, and the location is less constrained.

The rules and disciplines are normally the same as the traditional sport using live weapons.

There are four principal pieces of equipment for a laser clay shooting setup: guns, launcher, scoreboard and clays.

The activity can be done indoors or outdoors. Just like traditional clay shooting clays are released from a trap and the participants shoot at the flying disc. Unlike traditional clay shooting, multiple participants all shoot at the same disc. In most equipment the register of hits and misses is recorded electronically, and the sounds of the shotgun firing and the clay being hit are played from simulated sounds.

Although the activity is similar to traditional clay shooting it does use slightly different shooting principles, some of which are closer to target shooting.

References

External links

Qipt Outdoor Adventure Activity Portal
Laser Clay Shooting Range - Things to do in Reading

 
Shooting sports